Krogaspe is a municipality in the district of Rendsburg-Eckernförde, in Schleswig-Holstein, Germany. Krogaspe is located north west of Neumünster close to Autobahn A7 and county highway 205 to Rendsburg.

History 
Krogaspe was first mentioned in 1200 AD. The meaning of name is remote corner village with aspen. It is an indication that Krogaspe was a medieval settlement surrounded by poplar aspen.

The municipality is located on the historic military and trade route Ossenweg. Thousands of cattle have been driven down this old path through Schleswig-Holstein south towards the river Elbe.

In 1979, retired farmer Hinrich Plambeck released a chronicle of Krogaspe.

Politics 
The municipal council is made up of 5 seats for the voter coop ADW and 4 seats for the voter coop KWG.

Coat of Arms 
blazon: „Three green Espen trees next to each other above the red colored gable end of a lower-saxon timber frame farm house on a silver background"

References

Municipalities in Schleswig-Holstein
Rendsburg-Eckernförde